Gelfand is a surname meaning "elephant" in the Yiddish language and may refer to:

 People:
 Alan Gelfand, the inventor of the ollie, a skateboarding move
 Alan E. Gelfand, a statistician
 Boris Gelfand, a chess grandmaster
 Israel Gelfand, a mathematician,
 Mikhail Gelfand, a molecular biologist and bioinformacisist, a grandson of Israel Gelfand
 Vladimir Gelfand, a Soviet-Jewish writer
 Notions in mathematics (named after Israel Gelfand):
 the Gelfand representation, in mathematics, allows a complete characterization of commutative C*-algebras as algebras of continuous complex-valued functions
 the Gelfand–Naimark–Segal construction
 the Gelfand–Naimark theorem 
 the Gelfand–Mazur theorem
 a Gelfand pair, a pair (G,K) consisting of a locally compact unimodular group G and a compact subgroup K
 a Gelfand triple, a construction designed to link the distribution (test function) and square-integrable aspects of functional analysis

See also
 Gelfond
 Helfand
 Helfant

Germanic-language surnames
Russian-language surnames
Jewish surnames
Yiddish-language surnames